This was the first edition of Hong Kong Tennis Open.

Karolína and Kristýna Plíšková won the title, defeating Patricia Mayr-Achleitner and Arina Rodionova in the final, 6–2, 2–6, [12–10].

Seeds

Draw

References
Main Draw

Hong Kong Tennis Open
Hong Kong Open (tennis)